The 1969 Trans-American Championship was the fourth running of the Sports Car Club of America's Trans-Am Series. The championship was open to SCCA Sedan category cars competing in Over 2 liter and Under 2 liter classes. 1969 marked the end of the use of co-drivers in the Trans-Am Championship, as most of the races were between 2.5 and 3 hours. The Over 2 liter and Under 2 liter Manufacturers' titles were won by Chevrolet (Due in large part to Mark Donohue's 6 wins, and a major crash at the St. Jovite, Canada race that nearly destroyed all the Ford and Shelby team cars.) and Porsche (Due in large part to Peter Gregg's 7 wins) respectively.

Schedule

The championship was contested over twelve races.

Championships
Points were awarded for finishing positions in each class at each race on the following basis: 

Only the highest-placed car of each make could earn points for its manufacturer  and only the best nine results for each manufacturer counted towards the championship totals.

No Drivers titles were awarded in 1969 or in any other Trans-American Championship prior to 1972.

Over 2 liter Manufacturers Championship

Under 2 liter Manufacturers Championship

The cars
The following models contributed to the points totals of their respective manufacturers.

 Chevrolet Camaro
 Ford Mustang
 Pontiac Firebird
 AMC Javelin
 Porsche 911
 Alfa Romeo GTA
 BMW 2002Ti
 Mini Cooper S

1969 Pontiac Firebird Trans Am
1969 had marked the sales debut of the Pontiac Firebird Trans Am however the car's smallest engine was well over the 5000cc maximum set by the series at the time and it was not used in the 1969 championship. In using the name Trans Am, a registered trademark, General Motors agreed to pay $5 per car sold to the SCCA.

References

External links
 1969 Trans-Am, www.touringcarracing.net

Trans-Am Series
Transam
Transam